Andrey Nazário Afonso (born 9 November 1983 in Porto Alegre), known as just Andrey, is a Brazilian football goalkeeper who plays for Avenida.

Career
He made his debut with Steaua București on 1 March 2007, in the quarter-final cup match against Oţelul Galaţi, when Steaua București won 8–7 on penalties. He saved one penalty and was considered the man of the match. Just after a few weeks he was sent by chairman Gigi Becali at the second team, and then was released from team.

In 2008, recommended by new coach Adílson Batista, Andrey was signed by Brazilian side Cruzeiro.

Honours
FIFA U-20 World Cup: 2003 
Paraná State League: 2005 
Santa Catarina State League: 2006

References

External links

 
 

1983 births
Living people
Footballers from Porto Alegre
Brazilian footballers
Brazilian expatriate footballers
Brazil under-20 international footballers
Association football goalkeepers
Grêmio Foot-Ball Porto Alegrense players
Club Athletico Paranaense players
Figueirense FC players
Cruzeiro Esporte Clube players
Associação Portuguesa de Desportos players
Criciúma Esporte Clube players
ABC Futebol Clube players
América Futebol Clube (RN) players
FC Steaua București players
FC Steaua II București players
Expatriate footballers in Romania
Brazilian expatriate sportspeople in Romania
Liga I players